Nikolaos "Nikos" Smaragdis (born ) is a Greek male volleyball player. He has been 195 times capped with Greece national team.

Career
Smaragdis has won 10 times the Hellenic Championship. He is also the only Greek Volleyball player who achieved it, with four clubs.

International career
Smaragdis was part of the Greece men's national volleyball team at the 2006 FIVB Volleyball Men's World Championship in Japan.

Sporting achievements

Clubs

International competitions
 2008/2009   CEV Champions League, with Iraklis Thessaloniki
 2005/2006   CEV Cup, with Panathinaikos Athens

Hellenic championships
 2003/2004  Hellenic Championship, with Panathinaikos Athens
 2004/2005  Hellenic Championship, with Panathinaikos Athens
 2005/2006  Hellenic Championship, with Panathinaikos Athens
 2006/2007  Hellenic Championship, with Iraklis Thessaloniki
 2007/2008  Hellenic Championship, with Iraklis Thessaloniki
 2009/2010  Hellenic Championship, with Panathinaikos Athens
 2010/2011  Hellenic Championship, with Iraklis Thessaloniki
 2011/2012  Hellenic Championship, with Iraklis Thessaloniki
 2012/2013  Hellenic Championship, with Olympiacos Piraeus
 2013/2014  Hellenic Championship, with Olympiacos Piraeus
 2015/2016  Hellenic Championship, with P.A.O.K. Thessaloniki
 2016/2017  Hellenic Championship, with P.A.O.K. Thessaloniki
 2018/2019  Hellenic Championship, with Olympiacos Piraeus

Hellenic Cup
 2005/2006  Hellenic Cup, with Panathinaikos Athens
 2009/2010  Hellenic Cup, with Panathinaikos Athens
 2010/2011  Hellenic Cup, with Iraklis Thessaloniki
 2011/2012  Hellenic Cup, with Iraklis Thessaloniki
 2012/2013  Hellenic Cup, with Olympiacos Piraeus
 2013/2014  Hellenic Cup, with Olympiacos Piraeus
 2017/2018  Hellenic Cup, with Iraklis Thessaloniki

Hellenic League Cup
 2012/2013  Hellenic League Cup, with Olympiacos Piraeus
 2018/2019  Hellenic League Cup, with Olympiacos Piraeus

Hellenic Super Cup
 2007  Hellenic Super Cup, with Iraklis Thessaloniki
 2008  Hellenic Super Cup, with Iraklis Thessaloniki

References

External links
Nikolaos Smaragdis at CEV
profile at greekvolley.gr
profile at fivb.org
full profile at volleyball-movies.net

1982 births
Living people
Greek men's volleyball players
Olympiacos S.C. players
PAOK V.C. players
Iraklis V.C. players
Aris V.C. players
Volleyball players from Thessaloniki